The National Lacrosse League expansion draft is a meeting where the general managers of expansion National Lacrosse League teams begin to fill their teams with unprotected players from the rosters of existing NLL teams. Such a draft occurs whenever an expansion NLL franchise is awarded. The most recent expansion draft was in 2022 for the Las Vegas Desert Dogs. Prior drafts were:

 2021 (Panther City LC)
 2019 (New York Riptide and Rochester Knighthawks)
 2018 (Philadelphia Wings, San Diego Seals)
 2008 and 2007 (Boston)
 2006 (New York and Chicago)
 2005 (Edmonton and Portland).

2022 Draft results 
July 7, 2022

The following trades were made immediately following the draft:

 Las Vegas traded Riley Hutchcraft, Connor Fields and their 1st round Draft Pick (1st overall) in the 2022 Entry Draft to Rochester for Charlie Bertrand and their 1st round pick (2nd overall), 4th round pick (74th overall), 6th round pick (91st overall) in the 2022 Entry Draft and their 1st round selection in the 2023 Entry Draft
 Las Vegas traded Brett McIntyre back to Colorado for Sam Firth and Erik Turner
 Las Vegas traded Frank Scigliano back to San Diego for Mark Glicini, Brandon Clelland, their 2nd round pick (26th overall) in the 2022 Entry Draft and their 3rd round pick in the 2023 Entry Draft
 Las Vegas traded Jeff Cornwall to Calgary for Marshal King and their 1st round pick (18th overall) in the 2022 Entry Draft

2021 Draft results 
June 29, 2021

 Immediately following the draft, Chris Wardle was traded back to the Mammoth in exchange for Will Malcom and Jordan Trottier. Scott Dominey was traded to New York in exchange for Dawson Theede.

2019 Draft results
July 9, 2019

 - Immediately following the draft, Wardle was traded back to the Mammoth in exchange for Julian Garritano and Mike Mallory. Mallory was then traded to the Warriors for Travis Burton and a 2nd round pick in the 2020 entry draft.

2018 Draft results
July 16, 2018

 - Immediately following the draft, Sweeting was traded to the Buffalo Bandits in exchange for Ethan Schott and a 2nd round pick in the 2018 entry draft.

2008 Draft results

July 24, 2008 .

The Blazers traded Cam Bergman to Edmonton shortly after the Expansion Draft in exchange for forward Brenden Thenhaus and goaltender Kurtis Wagar.

2007 Draft results

July 31, 2007

2006 Draft results

July 12, 2006

2005 Draft results
June 15, 2005

2004 Draft results

October 19, 2004. Picks were announced in alphabetical order by former team.

2001 Draft results

June 15, 2001

1999 Draft results

August 26, 1999

References

See also
 National Lacrosse League dispersal draft
 National Lacrosse League entry draft

National Lacrosse League
Expansion drafts